Kembang Kertas is a 1984 Indonesian drama film directed by Slamet Rahardjo. The film won five awards at the Indonesian Film Festival in 1985, including Best Feature Film.

Accolades

References 

Citra Award winners
1980s Indonesian-language films
1984 films
1984 drama films
Indonesian drama films